Bowness-on-Solway is a village in the Allerdale borough of Cumbria, England. It is situated to the west of Carlisle on the southern side of the Solway Firth estuary separating England and Scotland. The civil parish had a population of 1,126 at the 2011 census.  The western end of Hadrian's Wall is a notable tourist destination, though the Wall itself is no longer to be seen here above ground. The west end of the Hadrian's Wall Path is marked by a pavilion on the small coastal cliff at Bowness. The village is part of the Solway Coast Area of Outstanding Natural Beauty.

Etymology
'Bowness' means 'rounded', or bow-shaped headland', from either the Old English 'boga', 'bow', and 'næss', or, more probably, the Old Norse 'bogi' and 'nes'.

Roman era

The village is situated on the site of the Roman fort called Maia, the second largest on Hadrian's Wall. There was also a small civilian settlement (vicus) outside the south gate of this fort.

Governance
Bowness-on-Solway is part of the parliamentary constituency of Workington. In the December 2019 general election, the Tory candidate for Workington, Mark Jenkinson, was elected the MP, overturning a 9.4 per cent Labour majority from the 2017 election to eject shadow environment secretary Sue Hayman by a margin of 4,136 votes. Until the December 2019 general election the Labour Party had won the seat in the constituency in every general election since 1979, while the Conservative Party had only been elected once in Workington since World War II, at the 1976 by-election.

Before Brexit, it was in the North West England European Parliamentary Constituency.

St Michael's Church

Built atop what may be the granary for the Roman fort in the 12th century, the two original bells were stolen by border raiders in 1626, accidentally dropping them in the Solway during their flight. In retaliation, the villagers raided Dornock and Middlebie in Scotland, making off with a new pair of bells. Traditionally, on inception, the vicar of Annan petitions the village's neighbours for the return of his bells.

Solway Viaduct

The construction of the viaduct prevented ships entering the upper Solway and hence destroyed the trade of Port Carlisle, which had already been largely supplanted by the construction of a wet dock at Silloth.  The viaduct suffered minor frost damage in 1875; in 1881 large sections of it were destroyed by ice floes, but the viaduct was rebuilt. The railway never lived up to its promoters' expectations, and in 1914 it was restricted to carrying goods only. In 1921 the railway was closed entirely, and in 1934 the viaduct was demolished.

Gallery

See also

Listed buildings in Bowness
Hadrian's Wall Path

References

External links

Cumbria County History Trust: Bowness-on-Solway (nb: provisional research only - see Talk page)
 VisitCumbria
 TheCumbriaDirectory

Villages in Cumbria
Populated coastal places in Cumbria
Civil parishes in Cumbria
Allerdale